John G Gray (12 July 1888 – 28 June 1947) was an Australian rules footballer who played with University in the Victorian Football League (VFL).

Football
A defender for University, his relatively long career at the club ended after the 1913 season.

Medicine
Upon completion of his medical degree, Gray moved to Corowa, New South Wales in 1914, after purchasing a practice from H D McKenzie. He would later serve in both World Wars.

He was appointed the Border United Football Club's Honorary Medical Officer for the 1919 Ovens and Murray Football League season and continued in this role for a number of years.

Gray settled in Corowa and conducted a general practice there for a number of years before returning to Melbourne, Victoria in 1924.

Death
He died in June 1947 whilst driving to see a patient in Toorak.

Footnotes

References
 Holmesby, Russell & Main, Jim (2007). The Encyclopedia of AFL Footballers. 7th ed. Melbourne: Bas Publishing.

External links
 
 

1888 births
1947 deaths
VFL/AFL players born outside Australia
University Football Club players
Australian rules footballers from Victoria (Australia)
Scottish players of Australian rules football
Scottish emigrants to Australia
Australian military personnel of World War I
Australian Army personnel of World War II
20th-century Australian medical doctors
People educated at Scotch College, Melbourne
Australian colonels